Roberto Mangas (January 17, 1914 – February 11, 1982) was a Mexican alpinist.

References 

1914 births
1982 deaths
Sportspeople from Pachuca